Hannah Al Rashid (born in London, United Kingdom on 25 January 1986) is an Indonesian actress, model, and activist. Of Bugis and French descent, she is mostly known for her works in Indonesian films and television. For her role in Aruna & Her Palate (2018), she received Citra Award and Maya Award nominations for Best Supporting Actress.

Early life 
Al Rashid was born in London to a French mother and an Indonesian father of Bugis descent from South Sulawesi. She graduated from the School of Oriental and African Studies at the University of London with a degree on Indonesian and Development Studies. She grew up in London and moved to Indonesia in 2008.

Career 
Al Rashid came to her father's home country Indonesia initially to work for the United Nations Development Programme. However, the plan fell through and she instead found job offers to star in a series of music videos for popular pop band Yovie & Nuno's singles off their 2007 album The Special One. In 2010, she became a Guest VJ on MTV Indonesia.

Her first venture in acting was in the comedy television show Awas Ada Sule, starring popular comedian Sule. She made her feature film debut with a minor role in the 2011 disaster drama film Hafalan Shalat Delisa, inspired by the 2004 Indian Ocean earthquake and tsunami. Her appearance in Joko Anwar's psychological thriller Ritual in 2012 garnered her mainstream recognition, followed by roles in anthology films 3Sum and V/H/S/2 in 2013.

Her big breakthrough came with a supporting role in the commercially successful comedy films Comic 8: Casino Kings Part 1 in 2015 and Comis 8: Casino Kings Part 2 in 2016, the latter of which earned her a nomination for Best Supporting Actress at the Indonesian Box Office Movie Awards 2017, losing to Asri Welas (Check the Store Next Door). Also in 2016, she appeared in Warkop DKI Reborn: Jangkrik Boss! Part 1 and received another nomination at the Indonesian Box Office Movie Awards 2017 in the Best Actress category, this time losing to Chelsea Islan (Rudy Habibie). As of January 2021, Warkop DKI Reborn: Jangkrik Boss! Part 1 is Indonesia's highest-grossing domestic film with 6.8 million admissions. She also appeared in the sequel, Warkop DKI Reborn: Jangkrik Boss! Part 2 which was released in 2017. Her other films in 2017 included the reboot of Jailangkung and an adaptation of Ika Natassa's best-selling novel Critical Eleven.

In 2018, Al Rashid co-starred in the Indonesian-Singaporean western film Buffalo Boys, Edwin's adaptation of Laksmi Pamuntjak's best-selling novel Aruna & Her Palate opposite top stars Dian Sastrowardoyo, Oka Antara, and Nicholas Saputra, as well as Timo Tjahjanto's Netflix action thriller The Night Comes for Us as an assassin. In 2019, Al Rashid briefly appeared in Joko Anwar's Gundala as the character Cantika the Nurse, one of Pengkor's orphan assassins. She then had a major role in Kimo Stamboel's The Queen of Black Magic as Nadya, wife to Ario Bayu's character Hanif.

She will next star in the British action-thriller film Exiled: The Chosen Ones set for a 2021 release date.

Personal life  

Al Rashid is known for her activism and identifies as a feminist. She often uses her social media platforms to spread social and political messages, which is uncommon among celebrities in Indonesia. She is a United Nations Sustainable Development Goals Mover for Gender Equality.

Hannah reportedly dated actor Ario Bayu in 2010. This was revealed when Hannah accompanied Ario in the launch of the film titled Catatan Si Boy. 

In December 2020, Al Rashid and fellow actor Nino Fernandez announced on separate Instagram posts that they have been married for a few years. The marriage was kept secret and was never reported on the media up to that point. They live together in London.

Filmography

Film

Television

Music Video

Awards and nominations

References

External links 
 
 

1986 births
British expatriates in Indonesia
English female models
21st-century English actresses
Living people
Bugis people
Indonesian people of Arab descent
Indonesian people of Iranian descent
Indonesian people of French descent
Citizens of Indonesia through descent
British people of Arab descent
British people of Bugis descent
British people of Indonesian descent
British people of French descent
English people of Arab descent
English people of Bugis descent
English people of Indonesian descent
English people of French descent
Indo people